The 1980 Ball State Cardinals football team was an American football team that represented Ball State University in the Mid-American Conference (MAC) during the 1980 NCAA Division I-A football season. In its third season under head coach Dwight Wallace, the team compiled a 6–5 record (5–4 against MAC opponents) and finished in a tie for fifth place out of ten teams in the conference. The team played its home games at Ball State Stadium in Muncie, Indiana.

The team's statistical leaders included Mark O'Connell with 1,921 passing yards, Ken Currin with 548 rushing yards, Stevie Nelson with 487 receiving yards, and Dane Fellmeth with 49 points scored.

Schedule

References

Ball State
Ball State Cardinals football seasons
Ball State Cardinals football